Inabanga, officially the Municipality of Inabanga,  is a 3rd class municipality in the province of Bohol, Philippines. According to the 2020 census, it has a population of 48,534 people.

The town of Inabanga, Bohol celebrates its fiesta on 29 and 30 June, to honor the town patron, Saint Paul.

Inabanga was the site of the 2017 Bohol clashes between Philippine security forces and Moro ISIL-affiliated militants led by members of the Abu Sayyaf.

Geography
The municipality is located at the mouth of the Inabanga River, the largest river in Bohol.

Land use:
 Timberland area: 
 Mangrove area: 
 Alienable & Disposable : None

Soil cover:
 Bantog clay
 Inabanga clay
 Bolinao clay
 Annam clay
 Hydrosol

Barangays

Inabanga comprises 50 barangays:

Climate

Demographics

Predominant religion: Roman Catholic.

Economy

Annual Income (2016): ₱114.0 million

Major industries:
 farming
 fishing
 mat-weaving
 nipa thatch-making

Tourism 

The North Bohol fault, which appeared during the 2013 Bohol earthquake, became a tourist attraction in Bohol province.

Infrastructure

Transportation

Total road length: 

Total number of bridges: 8

Utilities

Water supply:
 Main source of potable water: Groundwater
 L1 facilities – 489 water wells
 L2 systems in brgy Pob.
 L3 systems serving 22 barangays

Energization status (2010):
 50 barangays energized
 8,710 actual household connections (%)
 8,900 potential house connections

Number of households with access to sanitary toilets: 7,686 (%)

Welfare

 Number of Barangay Health Stations: 28
 Number of Hospitals: 1
 Number of Municipal Health Centers: 1
 Number of Day Care Centers: 50

Education

Literacy rate: 92%

Secondary and high schools:

 North:
 Cuaming HS
 Inabanga HS - Nabuad
 Inabanga North Integrated School
 San Jose NHS

 South:
 Saint Paul's Academy
 Dagnawan Integrated School
 Southern Inabanga HS

Elementary and primary schools:

 North:
 Anonang ES
 Baogo ES
 Cambitoon ES
 Cuaming ES
 Dait Sur ES
 Datag ES
 Hambongan ES
 Inabanga North Integrated Sch.
 Lawis ES
 Liloan Norte ES
 Liloan Sur ES
 Nabuad ES
 Ondol ES
 San Isidro ES
 San Jose ES

 South:
 Banahao ES
 Cagawasan ES
 Cawayan ES
 Dagnawaan Integrated Sch.
 Dagohoy ES
 Inabanga South Central ES
 Lutao ES
 Santo Rosario ES
 U-og Ubujan ES

Notable personalities

 Francisco Dagohoy - Filipino revolutionary leading the longest revolt in the Philippines
 Yamyam Gucong - Pinoy Big Brother Otso Big Winner

References

External links

Municipality of Inabanga

Municipalities of Bohol